Roneivaldo da Matta Soares, commonly known as Ney da Matta (17 April 1967 – 18 May 2019), was a Brazilian football manager, last in charge at CRAC.

Honours 
 Ipatinga
 Taça Minas Gerais: 2011

 Boa Esporte
 Campeonato Brasileiro Série C: 2016

Notes

External links

1967 births
2019 deaths
People from Ipatinga
Brazilian football managers
Campeonato Brasileiro Série B managers
Campeonato Brasileiro Série C managers
Campeonato Brasileiro Série D managers
Tupi Football Club managers
Valeriodoce Esporte Clube managers
Ipatinga Futebol Clube managers
Democrata Futebol Clube managers
Uberlândia Esporte Clube managers
Clube de Regatas Brasil managers
Sampaio Corrêa Futebol Clube managers
Grêmio Esportivo Brasil managers
Clube Atlético Linense managers
Clube Recreativo e Atlético Catalano managers
Brasiliense Futebol Clube managers
Vila Nova Futebol Clube managers
Anápolis Futebol Clube managers
Boa Esporte Clube managers
Tombense Futebol Clube managers
Guarani FC managers
Campinense Clube managers
Centro Sportivo Alagoano managers
Clube do Remo managers
América Futebol Clube (RN) managers
Sportspeople from Minas Gerais